The First Yamamoto Cabinet is the 16th Cabinet of Japan led by Yamamoto Gonnohyōe from February 20, 1913, to April 16, 1914.

Cabinet

References 

Cabinet of Japan
1913 establishments in Japan
Cabinets established in 1913
Cabinets disestablished in 1914